Hervé Jean-Pierre Villechaize (April 23, 1943 – September 4, 1993) was a French actor and painter. He is best known for his role as the evil henchman Nick Nack in the 1974 James Bond film The Man with the Golden Gun, and his role as Mr. Roarke's assistant, Tattoo, on the American television series Fantasy Island that he played from 1977-1983. On Fantasy Island, his shout of "The plane! The plane!" became one of the show's signature phrases.

Early life
Villechaize was born in Nazi-occupied Paris, France, on April 23, 1943, to English-born Evelyn (Recchionni) and André Villechaize, a surgeon in Toulon. The youngest of four sons, Villechaize was born with dwarfism, likely due to an endocrine disorder, which his surgeon father tried unsuccessfully to cure in several institutions. In later years, he insisted on being called a "midget" rather than a "dwarf", which annoyed his acting contemporary with a similar condition, Billy Barty, who was an activist who found that term derogatory. Villechaize was bullied at school for his condition and found solace in painting. In 1959, at age 16, he entered the École des Beaux-Arts to study art. In 1961, he became the youngest artist ever to have his work displayed in the Museum of Paris.

In 1964, Villechaize left France for the United States. He settled in a Bohemian section of New York City, and taught himself English by watching television.

Career
Villechaize initially worked as an artist, painter, and photographer. He began acting in Off-Broadway productions, including Werner Liepolt's The Young Master Dante and a play by Sam Shepard, and he also modelled for photos for National Lampoon before moving on to film.

His first film appearance was in Chappaqua (1966). His second film was Edward Summer's Item 72-D: The Adventures of Spa and Fon, filmed in 1969. This was followed by several films, including The Gang That Couldn't Shoot Straight (1971); Christopher Speeth and Werner Liepolt's Malatesta's Carnival of Blood (1973); Crazy Joe (1974); and Oliver Stone's first film, Seizure (1974). He was asked to play a role in Alejandro Jodorowsky's film Dune, which had originally begun pre-production in 1971, but was later cancelled.

His big break was getting cast in The Man with the Golden Gun (1974), by which time he had become so poor that he was living in his car in Los Angeles. Prior to being signed by Bond producer Albert R. Broccoli, he made ends meet by working as a rat catcher's assistant near his South Central home. From what his co-star Christopher Lee saw, The Man with the Golden Gun filming was possibly the happiest time of Villechaize's life; Lee likened it to honey in the sandwich between an insecure past and an uncertain future.

In addition to being an actor, Villechaize became an active member of a movement in 1970s and 1980s California to deal with child abuse and neglect, often going to crime scenes himself to help comfort abuse victims. Villechaize's former co-workers recalled that despite his stature, he often confronted and chastised spousal and child abusers when he arrived at crime scenes.

In the 1970s, Villechaize performed Oscar the Grouch on Sesame Street as a pair of legs peeping out from Oscar's trash can, for scenes that required Oscar to be mobile. These appearances began in the third season, and included the 1978 Hawaii episodes.

Though popular with the public, Villechaize proved a difficult actor on Fantasy Island, where he continually propositioned women and quarreled with the producers. He was eventually fired after demanding a salary on par with that of his co-star Ricardo Montalbán. Villechaize was replaced by Christopher Hewett.

In 1980, Cleveland International Records released a single by the Children of the World, featuring Villechaize as vocalist: "Why", with B-side "When a Child Is Born".

Villechaize starred in the movie Forbidden Zone (1980), and appeared in Airplane II: The Sequel (1982), and episodes of Diff'rent Strokes and Taxi. He later played the title role in the "Rumpelstiltskin" episode of Shelley Duvall's Faerie Tale Theatre. In the 1980s, he became popular in Spain due to his impersonations of Prime Minister Felipe González on the television show Viaje con nosotros (Travel with Us), with showman . His final appearance was a cameo as himself in an episode of The Ben Stiller Show.

Personal life and death
In the mid-1970s, Villechaize had a two-year relationship with actress Susan Tyrrell and shared a home with her in the Laurel Canyon area of Los Angeles.

During production of 1974's The Man with the Golden Gun, Bond star Sir Roger Moore was dismayed by Villechaize's alleged sexual proclivity, calling him a sex maniac. Moore said many decades later at a live event: "He was a very small man and he used to touch me and I used to say, 'Don't touch me. You are diseased.'" Moore followed up by adding, "I wasn't being cruel about his size; it was just that he was a sex maniac. He had a lust for ladies, unnatural."

Villechaize was married twice. He was divorced from his first wife in 1978 after eight years of marriage. He met his second wife, Camille Hagen, an actress and stand-in double, on the set of the pilot for Fantasy Island. They resided at a  San Fernando Valley ranch, which also was home to a menagerie of farm animals and pets. He had a few Hollywood friends, most notably country music singer Johnny Lee, whose concerts Villechaize would often attend in the 1980s.

In 1983, Haywood Nelson interviewed Villechaize for the television program That Teen Show—which included messages directed at depressed and suicide-prone teenagers—about his many suicide attempts. Villechaize said that he had learned to love life, even though the pain was severe and intense.

In the early morning hours of September 4, 1993, at his North Hollywood home, Villechaize, aged 50, is believed to have first fired a shot through the sliding-glass patio door to awaken his longtime girlfriend, Kathy Self, before shooting himself. Self found Villechaize in his backyard, and he was pronounced dead at the Medical Center of North Hollywood. His ashes were scattered into the Pacific Ocean off Point Fermin in San Pedro, Los Angeles, California.

Villechaize left a suicide note saying he was despondent over longtime health problems. He was suffering from chronic pain due to having oversized internal organs putting increasing pressure on his body. According to Self, Villechaize often slept in a kneeling position so he could breathe more easily. He also left an audio recording of the suicide that included his last words.

At the time of his death, Cartoon Network was in negotiations for him to co-star in Space Ghost Coast to Coast, which was in preproduction at the time. Villechaize would have voiced Space Ghost's sidekick on the show.

Depictions in media
In a March 2012 New York Times interview, Peter Dinklage revealed that Sacha Gervasi and he spent several years writing a script about Villechaize. Gervasi, a director and journalist, conducted a lengthy interview with Villechaize just prior to his suicide; according to Dinklage, "After he killed himself, Sacha realized Hervé's interview was a suicide note". The film, My Dinner with Hervé, which is based on the last few days of Villechaize's life, stars Dinklage in the title role, and premiered on HBO on October 20, 2018.

Filmography

References

External links
 

1943 births
1993 deaths
1993 suicides
Actors with dwarfism
French adoptees
French emigrants to the United States
French male film actors
French male television actors
French people of Italian descent
Male actors from Paris
Suicides by firearm in California
20th-century French male actors